Volney C. Ashford (November 15, 1907 – October 14, 1973) was an American football coach. He served as the head coach at Missouri Valley College for 28 season, from 1937 to 1942 and again from 1946 to 1967. He led the Missouri Valley Vikings to nine bowl games, including the Mineral Water Bowl in 1955 and the 1956 Tangerine Bowl.

Ashford left Missouri Valley during World War II to serve in the United States Navy. He was commissioned a lieutenant junior grade and left for the North Carolina Pre-Flight School at Chapel Hill, North Carolina in the spring of 1943. Ashford was later stationed at Iowa City, Iowa and returned to Missouri Valley in December 1945.

Ashford died of a heart attack on October 14, 1973. He was inducted into the College Football Hall of Fame in 2009.

Head coaching record

College football

References

External links
 

1907 births
1973 deaths
American football quarterbacks
Missouri Valley Vikings football coaches
Missouri Valley Vikings football players
High school basketball coaches in Missouri
High school football coaches in Missouri
College Football Hall of Fame inductees
United States Navy personnel of World War II
United States Navy officers
Sportspeople from Chicago
People from Marshall, Missouri
Players of American football from Chicago
Military personnel from Illinois